La Mejor del colegio (The best girl of college) is a 1953 Argentine musical comedy film directed by Julio Saraceni and starring Lolita Torres and Teresita Pagano.

Cast
Lolita Torres: María del Carmen Vallejo / María del Carmen Pérez / mother of María del Carmen
Teresita Pagano: Aurora / Aurora Pérez (friend of María del Carmen)
Francisco Álvarez: mr. Martín (grandfather of María del Carmen)	
Alberto Dalbés: Doctor Marcelo Carracedo	
Bertha Moss: Patricia	
Nelly Lainez: Antonia (false wife of doctor Carracedo)
José Comellas: Gervasio Vallejo (father of María del Carmen) 		
María Armand: mrs. Mercedes (grandmother of María del Carmen)		
Pedro Pompillo: mr. Bernardo
Ramón Garay: inspector Saporiti
Vicente Rubino: Valentín 		
Teresa Blasco: pupil of the college
Egle Martin: Nélida
Roberto Bordoni: manager of the Hotel
Arsenio Perdiguero: resident of the apartment number 150

References

External links
 

1953 films
1950s Spanish-language films
Argentine black-and-white films
Films directed by Julio Saraceni
1953 musical comedy films
Argentine musical comedy films
Tango films
1950s Argentine films